Mohammed Muyei (born February 7, 1975 in Niamey) is a former Nigerien footballer who last played for New Edubiase United.

Career 
Muyei played from 2001 to 2003 for Sekondi Hasaacas F.C., in the past he played also for Kelantan FA (01.07.2003-01.01.2005) and later for Stade Malien (Bamako, Mali).

International career 
He is also a member of Niger national football team his 2 games played in the World Cup Qualification 2006 on 11 October and 14 November 2003 vs Algeria national football team.

References

1975 births
Living people
Nigerien footballers
Expatriate footballers in Mali
Asante Kotoko S.C. players
Expatriate footballers in Ghana
Stade Malien players
Expatriate footballers in Malaysia
New Edubiase United F.C. players
People from Niamey
Association football forwards
Niger international footballers